The European Girls' Mathematical Olympiad (EGMO) is a mathematical olympiad for girls which started in 2012, and is held in April each year. It was inspired by the China Girls Mathematical Olympiad (CGMO). Although the competition is held in Europe, it is open to female participants from all over the world, and is considered the most prestigious mathematics competition for girls. In recent years, participants from around 60 countries have been invited to the competition.

Process and scoring
The competition is similar in style to the International Mathematical Olympiad (IMO), with two papers, each consisting of three problems to be solved in 4.5 hours, taken on consecutive days. Participating countries send teams consisting of four female mathematicians below the age of 20 who are not enrolled at a university. Each of the six problems are marked out of 7, making the maximum possible score 42 points.

The first edition was held in Cambridge, UK. Since then, 10 other countries in Europe have organized the EGMO. The number of participating countries have grown from 19 in the first edition to 57 in the eleventh edition, and the number of contestants from 61 in the first edition to 226 in the eleventh edition. The competitors participate as a team of 4 under the national flag but the contest itself is individual. The selection process varies between countries, but it often involves the results obtained in the national Mathematical Olympiads and in other tests, which become progressively more selective.

Medals are awarded according to this criterion:
 The top 1/12 of the competitors receive a gold medal
 The following 1/6 of the general classification receive a silver medal
 The subsequent 1/4 of the general classification receive a bronze medal
 All those who have not received a medal but have scored the maximum points in at least one of the six problems receive an honorable mention.

Summary

Medal table

The 61 countries that have won a medal are as follows:

The individuals with the most medals and appearances at the EGMO can be found on the "EGMO: Hall of Fame" section of the website. There have been 14 Perfect Scores (USA - 5, Russia - 4, Ukraine - 2, Serbia - 2, UK - 1) in the first 11 editions of the competition. Jelena Ivancic (Serbia) is the only contestant to have achieved more than one Perfect Score.

Impact
Inspired by the success of the EGMO, several international Olympiad competitions aimed at girls were recently launched. These include:
A new international programming competition, the European Girls' Olympiad in Informatics (EGOI), the first edition of which was held in Zurich, Switzerland. 
The Pan-American Girls' Mathematical Olympiad (PAGMO), the first edition organized virtually by a group of South American countries.

References

External links
 Official European Girls' Mathematical Olympiad Site
 European Girls' Mathematical Olympiad 2012
 European Girls' Mathematical Olympiad 2014
 European Girls' Mathematical Olympiad 2017
 European Girls' Mathematical Olympiad 2018
 European Girls' Mathematical Olympiad 2020
 European Girls' Mathematical Olympiad 2022

European culture
Maths
Mathematics competitions

pl:Europejska Olimpiada Matematyczna dla Dziewcząt